Latin American revolutions may refer to:
Spanish American wars of independence, 19th-century revolutionary wars against European colonial rule
For other revolutions and rebellions in Latin America, see List of revolutions and rebellions